Christine De Luca (born 4 April 1947) is a Scottish poet and writer from Shetland, who writes in both English and Shetland dialect. Her poetry has been translated into many languages. She was appointed Edinburgh's Makar, or poet laureate from 2014 to 2017. De Luca is a global advocate for the Shetland dialect and literature of the Northern Isles of Scotland.

Early life and education
De Luca was born Christine Pearson in Walls, Shetland. Her father, Sandy Pearson, was the headmaster of Happyhansel Junior Secondary School in Shetland. De Luca moved to Edinburgh in her late teens to study at University of Edinburgh. After graduation, she taught high school for several years and later obtained a Masters in Educational Research in 1980.

Writing career
De Luca's first three poetry collections were published by the Shetland Library. Her first collection, Voes and Sounds was published in 1994 and her second work, Wast Wi Da Valkyries, was published in 1997. Both collections won the Shetland Literary Prize. A third collection, 'Plain Song', was published in Shetland and Edinburgh in 2002.

In 2004, De Luca's pamphlet, Drops in Time's Ocean, was published by Hansel Co-operative Press. It is based on eight generations of De Luca's family's history. Her poetry collection, Parallel Worlds (Luath Press) was published in 2005. A bi-lingual volume of Du Luca's poetry was published in 2007 by éditions fédérop; Parallel Worlds (Mondes Parallèles), Poems Translated from English and Shetlandic, include De Luca's first four volumes of poetry and recent work, and was translated by Jean-Paul Blot and De Luca. In 2007, the collection won the poetry prize at the 9th Salon International du Livre Insulaire in Ouessant.

De Luca's sixth poetry collection, North End of Eden was published by Luath Press in 2010. In 2011, De Luca's novel, And Then Forever, was published by the Shetland Times. Her pamphlet, Dat Trickster Sun, (Mariscat Press 2014), was short-listed for the Michael Marks Awards for Poetry Pamphlets award in 2014. This was translated into Italian by Francesca Romana Paci in 2015 (Questo sole furfante) and published by Trauben, Torino.

De Luca was appointed Edinburgh's Makar (poet laureate) in 2014. She served as poet laureate from 2014 to 2017. Her poems have been chosen four times (2006, 2010, 2013 and 2015), by the Scottish Poetry Library for its annual 20 Best Scottish Poems list.
De Luca's work has been translated into several languages, including French, Italian, Swedish, Norwegian, Danish, Icelandic, Finnish, Estonian, Latvian, Polish, and Welsh.

Northern Isles advocacy

De Luca is an advocate for the Shetland dialect, travelling internationally to share her native dialect with similar linguistic cultures, like Scandinavia and Iceland. De Luca is a co-founder of Hansel Co-operative Press, a non-profit cooperative, which promotes literary and artistic work in Shetland and Orkney.

De Luca has focused on promoting her native language through work with Shetland children. She has written children's stories in the Shetland dialect. De Luca translated Roald Dahl’s George’s Marvellous Medicine into Shetland dialect as Dodie’s Phenomenal Pheesic (Black and White Publishing, 2008). Also published in 2016 by Black and White Publishing are two Julia Donaldson books, translated by De Luca: Da Trow (The Troll) and The Shetland Gruffalo's Bairn, (The Gruffalo's Child).

Selected publications
 2021, Veeve, Mariscat Press, poetry collection
 2021, The Art of Poetry & Other Poems, Hansel Cooperative Press, Selected poems by Eugénio de Andrade (Portuguese) with versions in English (A Levitin) & Shetlandic 
 2021, Another Time, Another Place, The Scottish Gallery, 12 paintings by Victoria Crowe, with 12 poems
 2020, Northern Alchemy, Patrician Press, Selected bilingual, Shetlandic with English versions
 2017, Heimferðir/ Haemfarins, Dimma, Selected bilingual, (mainly) Shetlandic with Icelandic versions by Aðalsteinn Ásberg Sigurðsson
 2017, Glimt av opphav/ Glims o Origin, Ura Forlag, Selected bilingual, Shetlandic with Norwegian versions by Odd Goysøyr
 2017, Edinburgh Singing the City, Saltire Society, poetry collection
 2015, Questo sole furfante, Nuova Trauben, bilingual version of Dat Trickster Sun with translations in Italian by Francesca Romana Paci
 2014, Dat Trickster Sun, Mariscat Press, pamphlet 
 2011, And Then Forever, Shetland Times, novel
 2010, North End of Eden,Luath Press, poetry collection
 2007, Mondes Parallèles Translated from English and Shetlandic by Jean-Paul Blot, éditions fédérop, poetry collection
 2005, Parallel Worlds, Luath Press, poetry collection
 2004, Drop's in Time's Ocean, Hansel Cooperative Press, pamphlet
 2002, Plain Song, The Shetland Library, poetry collection
 1997, Wast Wi Da Valkyries, The Shetland Library, poetry collection
 1994, Voes and Sounds, The Shetland Library, poetry collection

Awards and recognition
 2014, appointed Edinburgh's Makar, (2014—2017)
 2014, shortlisted for Michael Marks Awards for Poetry Pamphlets, for Dat Trickster Sun
 2007, International Book Fair in Ouessant, poetry prize, for Parallel Worlds , poems translated from English and Shetlandic
 1999, Shetland Literary Prize for Wast Wi Da Valkyries
 1996, Shetland Literary Prize, for Voce and Sounds

Notes

References

External links
 Shetland Dialect website
 Scottish Poetry Library
 Scottish Language Center: Shetland

People from Shetland
Scottish women poets
Alumni of the University of Edinburgh
Living people
Shetland poets
1947 births
Scots-language poets
20th-century Scottish poets
20th-century Scottish women writers
21st-century Scottish poets
21st-century Scottish women writers